Series 44 of University Challenge began on 14 July 2014 on BBC Two. This was the 21st series to be broadcast on the BBC. It was won by the team from Gonville and Caius College, Cambridge.

Results
Winning teams are highlighted in bold.
Teams with green scores (winners) returned in the next round, while those with red scores (losers) were eliminated.
Teams with orange scores had to win one more match to return in the next round (current highest scoring losers, teams that won their first quarter-final match, teams that won their second quarter-final match having lost their first, or teams that won their first quarter-final match and lost their second).
Teams with yellow scores indicate that two further matches had to be played and won (teams that lost their first quarter-final match).
A score in italics indicates a match decided on a tie-breaker question.

First round

Highest Scoring Losers play-offs

Second round

Quarter-finals

Semi-finals

Final

 The trophy and title were awarded to the Gonville & Caius Cambridge team comprising Ted Loveday, Michael Taylor, Anthony Martinelli and Jeremy Warner. Loveday later claimed that he had "learned his answers on Wikipedia".
 The trophy was presented by Will Self, who claimed to have known "about 35%" of the answers.

Spin-off: Christmas Special 2014
Each year, a Christmas special sequence is aired featuring distinguished alumni. Out of 7 first-round winners, the top 4 highest-scoring teams progress to the semi-finals. The teams consist of  celebrities who represent their alma maters.

Results
Winning teams are highlighted in bold.
Teams with green scores (winners) returned in the next round, while those with red scores (losers) were eliminated.
Teams with grey scores won their match but did not achieve a high enough score to proceed to the next round.
A score in italics indicates a match decided on a tie-breaker question.

First Round

Standings for the winners

Semi-finals

Final

The winning Trinity Hall, Cambridge team of Tom James, Emma Pooley, Adam Mars-Jones and Dan Starkey beat the University of Hull and their team of Rosie Millard, Malcolm Sinclair, Jenni Murray and Stan Cullimore.

References

External links
University Challenge homepage
Blanchflower Results Table

2015
2014 British television seasons
2015 British television seasons